St. Jerome Emiliani Institute (abbreviated as SJEI) is a private, co-educational Catholic Institution conducted by the Somascan Missionary Sisters. It is located on the back of Sto. Niño de Molino Parish Church, Bahayang Pag-asa, Molino, Bacoor, Cavite, Philippines. Like its namesake schools, the students of SJEI are called Jeromians.

External links
School website

Catholic elementary schools in the Philippines
Schools in Bacoor
1985 establishments in the Philippines